Wren (formerly, Midway) is an unincorporated community in Charlotte County, Virginia. It lies at an elevation of 604 feet (184 m).

References

Unincorporated communities in Charlotte County, Virginia
Unincorporated communities in Virginia